Snydertown may refer to:

Snydertown, New Jersey
Snydertown, Centre County, Pennsylvania
Snydertown, Fayette County, Pennsylvania
Snydertown, Huntingdon County, Pennsylvania
Snydertown, Northumberland County, Pennsylvania, a borough
Snydertown, Westmoreland County, Pennsylvania